"Eres Mi Religión" (English: You Are My Religion) is the second radio single and ninth track from Maná's sixth studio album, Revolución de Amor (2002). On the week of November 16, 2002 the song debuted at number forty seven on the U.S. Billboard Hot Latin Tracks and after seven weeks later on January 4, 2003 it reached its highest point at #17 for a week. It stayed on the charts for a total of 23 weeks.

Charts

References

2002 singles
Maná songs
Spanish-language songs
Songs written by Fher Olvera
Warner Music Latina singles
2002 songs